Proto-Kra is the reconstructed ancestor of the Kra languages. It was reconstructed in 2000 by Weera Ostapirat in his Ph.D. dissertation.

Lower-level reconstructions
Ostapirat (2000) provided preliminary phonological reconstructions for several lower-level groupings before attempting a reconstruction of Proto-Kra.

Proto-Kra
Proto-South-Western Kra
Proto-Western Kra (Gelao, Lachi)
Proto-Southern Kra (Laha)
Proto-Central-East Kra
Proto-Central Kra (Paha)
Proto-Eastern Kra (Buyang, Qabiao)

Phonology

Consonants
Proto-Kra has a total of 32 consonants, seven of which (marked in green) can occur as syllable finals (Ostapirat 2000:224, 236).

Miyake (2008, 2021)
Marc Miyake (2008, 2021) proposes alternative reconstructions for Ostapirat's (2000) Proto-Kra retroflex consonants, suggesting that many of them were actually non-retroflexes that had been influenced by pre-syllables, in particular with alveolar consonants leniting in intervocalic position. In synchronic Kra languages, reflexes are often attested as voiced fricatives, which Miyake (2021) does not believe to have developed from historical initial retroflex consonants. Some examples of Miyake's (2008) revised Proto-Kra reconstructions are provided below.

 *tsəm 'one' (Ostapirat's Proto-Kra *tʂəmC)
 *tsun 'teach' (Ostapirat's Proto-Kra *tʂunA)
 *N-tsu 'pillar' (Ostapirat's Proto-Kra *m-tʂuA)
 *nok 'bird' (Ostapirat's Proto-Kra *ɳokD)
 *nui 'snow' (Ostapirat's Proto-Kra *ɳuiA)
 *nəl 'fat' (Ostapirat's Proto-Kra *(m-)ɳəlA)
 *CV-nəŋh 'salty' (Ostapirat's Proto-Kra *ʔ-ɳəŋB)
 *na 'thick' (Ostapirat's Proto-Kra *C-naA)
 *nak 'give' (Ostapirat's Proto-Kra *nakD)
 *klep 'fingernail' (Ostapirat's Proto-Kra *ʈ-lepD)
 *(k/tV-)loŋ 'vegetable' (Ostapirat's Proto-Kra *ɖ-loŋA)

Miyake (2021) reconstructs some disyllabic lexical forms for Proto-Kra, including *mataA 'eye', *manokD 'bird', and *kVtuA1 'louse'.

Additionally, Miyake (2008) revises Ostapirat's Proto-Kra *pwl- as *CV-pl-, *bwl- as *CV-bl-, *m-pl- as *pl-, *(p/d/k)-l- as *(p/d/k)V-l-, *ʈ-l- as k-l-, and *ɖ-l- as *(k/tV)-l-. Proto-Kra consonants in Miyake (2021) as compared to Ostapirat (2000) are:

Vowels
Proto-Kra has a total of 6 vowels (Ostapirat 2000:235).

Proto-Kra has 4 diphthongs, which are not found in closed syllables.

Tones
Proto-Kra had an A–B–C–D tonal system typical of other Tai–Kadai languages (see Proto-Tai language#Tones). The tonal descriptions below are from Ostapirat (2000:237).

 *A: *A is one of the most common tones.
 *B: *B and *D are  phonetically similar, as reflexes of tone *D are often the same as those of *B. This regularly occurs in all Kra languages except for Qabiao.
 *C: *C is usually accompanied by glottal constriction and may have originally had a creaky or tense laryngeal quality. Some Gelao varieties and Yalang Buyang display the same reflex for *B and *C.
 *D: *D is the only tone to occur exclusively in closed syllables.

The following table of phonetic characteristics of Proto-Kra tones was adapted from Ostapirat (2000:237).

Lexicon
Below are reconstructed Proto-Kra forms from Ostapirat (2000).

Body parts and bodily functions
 *taiC 'armpit (1)'
 *ljeA 'armpit (2)'
 *mumC 'beard'
 *hmokD 'belly'
 *platD 'blood (1)'
 *kɣaC 'blood (2)'
 *plaɯC 'boil (n.)'
 *dəkD 'bone'
 *m-laB 'cheek/face'
 *təkD 'chest'
 *kaŋC 'chin'
 *k-raA 'ear'
 *kaiC 'excrement (1)'
 *ʔikD 'excrement (2)'
 *m-ʈaA 'eye'
 *C-totD 'fart'
 *ʈ-lepD 'fingernail'
 *kokD 'foot'
 *C-dəŋA 'forehead'
 *m-diA 'gall bladder'
 *motD 'hair'
 *m-səmA 'hair (head)'
 *mjaA 'hand'
 *kraiB 'head'
 *hlulC 'heart'
 *C-siC 'intestine'
 *C-kuB 'knee'
 *C-kaA 'leg'
 *təpD 'liver'
 *ʔaɯC 'meat'
 *ŋuŋA 'mouth (1)'
 *mulB 'mouth (2)'
 *m-ɖaɯA 'navel'
 *C-joA 'neck'
 *hŋətD 'nose (1)'
 *teŋC 'nose (2)'
 *hŋwuB 'pus'
 *t-ruB 'saliva'
 *m-baB 'shoulder'
 *kwauB 'skin (1)'
 *taA 'skin (2)'
 *boŋA 'skin (3)'
 *hloŋA 'stomach'
 *ʒaC 'tear (n.)'
 *ɣwjənA 'tendon (1)'
 *ŋenA 'tendon (2)'
 *t-roŋA 'throat (1)'
 *kɣeA 'throat (2)'
 *l-maA 'tongue'
 *l-pənA 'tooth (1)'
 *C-tʃuŋA 'tooth (2)'
 *t-luC 'waist'

Animals
 *motD 'ant'
 *C-meA 'bear'
 *reA 'bee'
 *ɳokD 'bird'
 *kwaiA 'buffalo'
 *kuC 'cat (wild)'
 *kiA 'chicken'
 *niA 'cow'
 *d-ratD 'crab'
 *ʔakD 'crow (n.)'
 *ditD 'deer'
 *x-maA 'dog'
 *blaɯA 'duck (1)'
 *kapD 'duck (2)'
 *ʈəmA 'egg'
 *p-laA 'fish'
 *x-mətD 'flea'
 *meC 'goat'
 *d-laŋC 'hawk'
 *C-kuA 'horn'
 *ŋjaC 'horse'
 *C-ʈuA 'louse (head)'
 *m-drəlA 'louse (body)'
 *kʒətD 'maggot'
 *taiC 'monkey (1)'
 *krokD 'monkey (2)'
 *m-luA 'monkey (gibbon)'
 *dʒaŋA 'mosquito'
 *x-muA 'pig'
 *hlaiC 'rat'
 *tʃuiA 'shellfish'
 *C-tʃotD 'tail'
 *ŋaA 'snake'
 *(k-)diA 'tiger'
 *gwjaA 'wing'

Plants
 *tokD 'banana'
 *m-teC 'beans'
 *m-pwaB 'bran'
 *kaA 'cogon grass'
 *m-tiŋA 'cucumber'
 *C-kənA 'ear of grain'
 *hŋaC 'flower (1)'
 *balA 'flower (2)'
 *C-makD 'fruit'
 *C-suiB 'garlic (1)'
 *kɣaA 'garlic (2)'
 *kɣiŋA 'ginger'
 *t-laɯA 'grass/tobacco'
 *ɖiŋA 'leaf'
 *l-kaA 'mushroom'
 *caA 'paddy (grain)'
 *m-pləŋA 'peach'
 *mla(ɯ)C 'rice (cooked)'
 *salA 'rice (husked)'
 *kʒaŋA 'rice'
 *tsaŋA 'root'
 *peA 'seed'
 *l-ŋaA 'sesame'
 *ʒaŋA 'sorghum'
 *p-ɣakD 'taro (1)'
 *rwauC 'taro (2)'
 *ŋjanC 'thorn'
 *tiA 'tree'
 *ɖ-loŋA 'vegetable (1)'
 *ʔopD 'vegetable (2)'
 *məlA 'yam'

Nature
 *m-tuB1 'ash'
 *laB 'coal'
 *mukD 'cloud/fog'
 *luB 'earth'
 *ʔutD 'earth (soil/mud)'
 *naA 'field (wet)'
 *zaC 'field (dry)'
 *puiA 'fire'
 *suiA 'firewood'
 *l-meA 'frost'
 *tsepD 'hail'
 *kjəlC 'iron'
 *m-ɖjanA 'moon (1)'
 *(C-)tjanA 'moon (2)'
 *dʐuA 'mountain'
 *monA 'rain'
 *jəlA 'rain'
 *kronA 'road'
 *t-laB 'rock (1)'
 *ʔuŋA 'rock (2)'
 *p-raA 'rock (3)'
 *hŋaiA 'sand'
 *praɯB 'silver (1)'
 *ŋjənA 'silver (2)'
 *m-kwənA 'smoke'
 *ɳuiA 'snow'
 *d-luŋA 'star'
 *t-laŋA 'sunlight'
 *(l-)wənA 'sun'
 *ʔuŋC 'water'
 *gwjənA 'wind'

Material culture
 *kwanA 'ax'
 *daA 'boat'
 *dzaɯB/C 'chopsticks'
 *C-ʃeA 'comb'
 *trauC 'den/nest'
 *x-ŋoA 'door'
 *d-luŋA 'drum'
 *t-lopD 'hat (bamboo)'
 *kranA 'house'
 *kwliA 'ladder (1)'
 *kɣuŋA 'ladder (2)'
 *pluA 'liquor (1)'
 *C-kaC 'liquor (2)'
 *t-laɯA 'medicine'
 *druA 'mortar'
 *ŋlotD 'needle'
 *tsakD 'pestle'
 *m-tʂuA 'pillar'
 *hɲeA 'pillow'
 *C-ʃakD 'rope'
 *ɲoA 'salt'
 *gwaŋA 'sieve'
 *ʔenC 'skirt'
 *ʒunB 'thread'
 *mɣaiA 'village'

Kinship and pronouns
 *taiA 'brother (elder)'
 *ʒaɯB 'brother (younger)'
 *lakD 'child'
 *baA 'father'
 *paB1 'father'
 *m-liB 'female-in-law'
 *klalA 'grandchild'
 *m-pauB 'grandfather'
 *jaC 'grandmother'
 *kuA 'I (1)'
 *ʔeA 'I (2)'
 *C-paɯC 'male/husband'
 *seA 'male/husband'
 *dʒuC 'male-in-law'
 *maiC 'mother'
 *n(ʒ)iA 'name'
 *bɣuŋC 'orphan'
 *piC 'sister (elder)'
 *ʔonC 'sister (younger)'
 *ŋunA 'spirit'
 *r-maŋA 'spirit'
 *ʒanA 'strength'
 *t-ɣuA 'we'
 *ʔ-nauA/C 'who'
 *məA/B 'you'

Adjectives
 *kəmA 'bitter'
 *hl/dəmA 'black'
 *ʔaŋC 'bright'
 *ŋəlC 'deaf'
 *(h)ləkD 'deep'
 *r-meA 'drunk'
 *kʒaB 'dry'
 *k-liA 'far'
 *(m-)ɳəlA 'fat'
 *m-tikD 'full'
 *ʔaiA 'good'
 *kʒəlA 'heavy'
 *piŋC 'hot'
 *dokD 'itchy'
 *prenA 'lazy'
 *kʒaC 'light (not heavy)'
 *riC 'long'
 *ʔiB 'many'
 *d-laC 'near'
 *malA 'new'
 *kuB 'old (1)'
 *kjaC/B 'old (2)'
 *(k-)ɖepD 'raw'
 *ŋ(w)aB 'real'
 *hŋwuB 'ripe'
 *roŋB 'rotten'
 *ʔ-ɳəŋB 'salty'
 *tʃiB 'satiated'
 *ɖjelC/B 'shallow'
 *hɲanC 'short (not long 1)'
 *tiC 'short (not long 2)'
 *taB/C 'short (not tall)'
 *gjaɯC 'skinny'
 *bwlatD 'sour'
 *ʔetD 'small'
 *muB 'smelly'
 *tjelC 'sweet'
 *k-ɣwaŋA 'tall'
 *C-naA 'thick'
 *ɣwəC 'thin'
 *tuC 'warm (1)'
 *ʔunB 'warm (2)'
 *rəkD 'wet'
 *r-ʔukD 'white'
 *C-ŋilC 'yellow'

Verbs
 *p-laA 'afraid'
 *pluŋC 'alive'
 *tsiC 'ask'
 *m-plauB 'bark (v.)'
 *ʔapD 'bathe'
 *ʈaiB 'bite'
 *rəmC 'bite'
 *tsolA 'buy'
 *paC 'carry on back (1)'
 *m-blikD 'carry on back (2)'
 *s-leB 'choose'
 *kləpD 'close eye (1)'
 *nəpD 'close eye (2)'
 *(C-)maA 'come'
 *m-duŋA 'come (return)'
 *ɖəŋA 'crow (v.)'
 *teC 'cut (1)'
 *hrənC 'cut (2)'
 *caɯC 'descend (1)'
 *d-loŋA 'descend (2)'
 *pɣonA 'die'
 *duA 'do'
 *l-pənA 'dream'
 *hromC 'drink'
 *m-ʈakD 'dry in sun'
 *kanA 'eat'
 *tokD 'fall'
 *t-luiA 'flow'
 *dəpD 'forget'
 *nakD 'give'
 *pwənB 'get (1)'
 *m-toB 'get (2)'
 *ɣwaC 'go'
 *kəmC 'hatch'
 *ʔənA 'have'
 *dʒəkD 'hear'
 *komA 'hold in mouth (1)'
 *ʔomA 'hold in mouth (2)'
 *p-ɣonA 'kill'
 *soA 'know'
 *k-soA 'laugh'
 *limC 'lick'
 *(h)ŋwaiA/B 'love'
 *təmC 'plant (v.)'
 *betD 'pluck'
 *(ʔ)jəŋA/C 'rest'
 *ʔiB 'scold (1)'
 *kənC 'scold (2)'
 *hɲanB 'scold (3)'
 *kaiA 'see'
 *tiC 'see (look)'
 *s-ɣwiA 'sell'
 *səlB 'shake/shiver'
 *d-riC 'sick'
 *ŋuB 'sleep (1)'
 *ʔuB 'sleep (2)'
 *muB 'smell'
 *pɣaB 'split (1)'
 *deB 'split (2)'
 *lumC 'steal'
 *tsuC 'steam (v.)'
 *d-lwal C/A 'swallow (v.)'
 *klutD 'take off'
 *tʂunA 'teach'
 *hŋa(ɯ)A 'wait'
 *C-pwiA 'walk'
 *leC 'wear'
 *ɲitD 'weep'

Space, time, and deictics
 *ljuA 'above'
 *lonA 'back/behind'
 *dəŋC 'back/behind'
 *kunA 'before/front'
 *ɲunB/C 'below'
 *(h)wənA 'day'
 *t-luŋC 'inside'
 *mjaŋB 'left'
 *m-ɖjanA 'month'
 *riC 'outside'
 *(x-)mitD 'right'
 *ʔ-ɲaC/B 'that'
 *ʔ-niC/B 'this'
 *m-(p)ɣiŋA 'year'

Numerals
 *tʂəmC 'one'
 *saA 'two'
 *tuA 'three'
 *pəA 'four'
 *r-maA 'five'
 *x-nəmA 'six'
 *t-ruA 'seven'
 *m-ruA 'eight'
 *s-ɣwaB 'nine'
 *pwlotD 'ten'
 *kjənA 'hundred'

Notes

References

Chen, Y.-L. (2018). Proto-Ong-Be. Doctoral dissertation, University of Hawaiʻi at Mānoa.
Hsiu, Andrew. 2017. Potential loanwords in Kra.
Miyake, Marc. 2018. Chu and Kra-Dai.
Miyake, Marc. 2013. The other Kra-Dai numerals (Parts 1, 2).
Miyake, Marc. 2013. Proto-Kra 'seven'.
Miyake, Marc. 2013. Retroflexion or lenition?: Kra-Dai 'eye'.
Miyake, Marc. 2013. Thurgood's "Tai-Kadai and Austronesian: the nature of the historical relationship" (1994).
Miyake, Marc. 2012. t for *p in Vietnamese.
Miyake, Marc. 2011. Dating Proto-Kra-Dai: the clue of the old chicken.
Miyake, Marc. 2008. Did Proto-Kra have retroflex initials? (Parts 1, 2-6, 7-9, 10, 11)
Miyake, Marc. 2008. Correspondences between Proto-Kra and Proto-Tai implosives.
Miyake, Marc. 2008. From presyllables to Proto-Kra clusters?
Miyake, Marc. 2008. Proto-Kra presyllables and clusters with labial stops
Miyake, Marc. 2008. Were Kra words for 'chopsticks' borrowed from Chinese?
Miyake, Marc. 2008. 布央 Cloth center consonants.
Miyake, Marc. 2008. Limited knowledge only gets you *so far.
Miyake, Marc. 2008. What's *so funny about knowledge?
Ostapirat, Weera. 2000. "Proto-Kra." Linguistics of the Tibeto-Burman Area 23 (1): 1-251.
Ostapirat, Weera. (2009). Proto-Tai and Kra-Dai Finals *-l and *-c. Journal of Language and Culture, 28(2), 41-56.
Ostapirat, Weera. (2013). The Rime System of Proto-Tai. Bulletin of Chinese Linguistics, 7(1), 189-227.
Pittayaporn, Pittayawat. (2009). The Phonology of Proto-Tai (Doctoral dissertation). Cornell University.

See also
Proto-Austronesian language
Proto-Hlai language
Proto-Kam–Sui language
Proto-Tai language
Austro-Tai languages

External links

 ABVD: Proto-Kra word list
 ABVD: word lists of Kra-Dai languages

Kra languages
Kra